Connecticut's 143rd House district is one of 151 Connecticut House of Representatives districts. It is represented by Dominique Johnson. The district consisted of parts of Norwalk, Westport, and Wilton until the 2021 redistricting, when it was redrawn to include only portions of Norwalk and Westport.

List of representatives

Recent Election Results

2022

2020

External links 
 Connecticut House District Map 2021

 Connecticut House District Map pre-2021

References

143
Norwalk, Connecticut
Westport, Connecticut
Wilton, Connecticut